Seshcha is an air base near Dubrovka, Bryansk Oblast of the Russian Air Force as part of Military Transport Aviation.

The airbase was placed in operations in the early 1930s. 

The base is home to the 566th Military Transport Aviation Regiment which flies the Antonov An-124 (NATO: Condor) of the 12th Military Transport Aircraft Division. The regiment arrived at the base in August 1958.

References

Russian Air Force bases
Military installations established in the 1930s
Buildings and structures in Bryansk Oblast